The Mens is a  biological Site of Special Scientific Interest west of Billingshurst in West Sussex. It is a Nature Conservation Review site, Grade I and a Special Area of Conservation.

This large area of woodland has diverse breeding birds and rich lichen and fungal floras. There are many rare beetles and a fly which is endangered with extinction, Chelostoma curvinervis. All three British species of woodpecker breed on the site, together with other woodland species such as nightingales, woodcocks and wood warblers.

References

Sussex Wildlife Trust
Sites of Special Scientific Interest in West Sussex
Forests and woodlands of West Sussex